Royal Air Force Lydd or more simply RAF Lydd is a former Royal Air Force Advanced Landing Ground located  north-west of Lydd, Kent and  south of Ashford, Kent, England.

History

The following units were here at some point:
 No. 121 Airfield RAF (July - August 1943)
 No. 174 Squadron RAF
 No. 175 Squadron RAF
 No. 245 Squadron RAF
 No. 2794 Squadron RAF Regiment
 No. 2800 Squadron RAF Regiment
 No. 2845 Squadron RAF Regiment
 No. 2889 Squadron RAF Regiment
 No. 2891 Squadron RAF Regiment
 No. 3205 Servicing Commando
 No. 3206 Servicing Commando

Current use

The site has reverted to farmland and has no connection with the current Lydd Airport which is located to the east of Lydd.

See also

 List of former Royal Air Force stations

References

Citations

Bibliography

Lydd